Hippolyte Le Roux (Paris 1 July 1801 – Paris, 1 July 1860) was a 19th-century French actor and playwright.

As an actor, he appeared in le Festin de pierre at the Théâtre-Français (1847) and in La Vieillesse de Richelieu (Fronsac) by Octave Feuillet and Pierre-François Bocage at the Comédie-Française in 1848.

His plays were presented on the most prestigious Parisian stages of the 19th century including the Théâtre des Folies-Dramatiques, Théâtre du Palais-Royal, Théâtre des Variétés, and the Théâtre du Vaudeville.

Works 

1827: Le Jaloux, comédie en vaudeville in 1 act
1827: Une soirée à la mode, comédie-vaudeville in 1 act, with Antoine-François Varner and Jean-François-Alfred Bayard
1829: Les Mendiants, vaudeville in 3 tableaux, with Henry Monnier
1829: Le Petit Tambour, tableau in 1 act
1829: Le Vieux Pensionnaire, comédie-vaudeville in 1 act, with Bayard
1829: La Maîtresse, comédie-vaudeville in 2 acts, with Alexis Decomberousse and Merville
1831: Les Artisans, ou le Lendemain de la noce, tableau-vaudeville, with Eugène Lebas
1833: Le Coucher du soleil, comédie-vaudeville in 1 act, with Mélesville
1833: Le Soupçon, comédie-vaudeville in 1 act
1834: Une fille à établir, comédie-vaudeville in 2 acts, with Bayard
1835: La Famille de la future, comédie-vaudeville in 1 act
1837: Trop Heureuse ou Un jeune ménage, comedy in 1 act, with Jacques-François Ancelot
1837: Mal noté dans le quartier, tableau populaire in 1 act, with Desvergers and Étienne Arago
1838: Une nuit d'attente, scène dramatique, mingled with songs, with Alexandre Pierre Joseph Doche
1842: Au croissant d'argent, comédie-vaudeville in 2 acts, with Ferdinand de Villeneuve
1842: La Dragonne, comedy in 2 acts, mingled with song, with Dumanoir
1842: La Plaine de Grenelle, 1812, drama in 5 acts, with Charles Desnoyer
1842: Le Grand-Palatin, comédie-vaudeville in 3 acts, with Félix-Auguste Duvert and Augustin-Théodore de Lauzanne de Vauroussel
1844: Les Petites Bonnes de Paris
1844: Péché et Pénitence, comédie-vaudeville in 2 acts
1844: Le Client, ou les Représailles, comédie-vaudeville in 1 act
1847: Une chaise pour deux, vaudeville en 1 act
1852: Les Blooméristes, ou la Réforme des jupons, vaudeville in 1 act, with Clairville
1856: La Chasse aux écriteaux, vaudeville in 3 acts and 1 prologue, with Théodore Cogniard
1857: Le Bras d'Ernest, comédie-vaudeville in 1 act, with Eugène Labiche
1860: Sourd comme un pot !, comedy in 1 act, mingled with song.

Bibliography 
 Joseph Marie Quérard, La France littéraire ou dictionnaire bibliographique des savants..., vol.5, 1833, 
 Louis Gustave Vapereau, Dictionnaire universel des contemporains, vol.2, 1870, 
 Pierre Larousse, Grand dictionnaire universel du XIXe siècle, 1873
 Camille Dreyfus, André Berthelot, La Grande encyclopédie: inventaire raisonné des sciences, des lettres et des arts, Vol.22, 1886, 

19th-century French male actors
French male stage actors
19th-century French dramatists and playwrights
Writers from Paris
1801 births
1860 deaths